Behind the Headlines may refer to:
 Behind the Headlines (1937 film), an American film 
 Behind the Headlines (1953 film), a British film directed by Maclean Rogers
 Behind the Headlines (1956 film), a British film directed by Charles Saunders
 Behind the Headlines with Mark Hyman, an editorial series by commentator Mark Hyman